Fountain of Two Oceans is an outdoor 1984 fountain and sculpture by Sergio Benvenuti, installed in San Diego, in the U.S. state of California. It features a nude man and woman facing one another.

See also

 1984 in art

References

External links
 

1984 establishments in California
1984 sculptures
Fountains in California
Nude sculptures in California
Outdoor sculptures in San Diego
Sculptures of men in California
Sculptures of women in California
Statues in San Diego